
This is a list of aircraft in numerical order of manufacturer followed by alphabetical order beginning with 'M'.

Mu

Mudry 
(Avions Mudry Cie / Auguste Mudry)
 Mudry CAP 1
 Mudry CAP 10
 Mudry CAP 20
 Mudry CAP 20LS-180
 Mudry CAP 20LS-200
 Mudry CAP 21
 Mudry CAP-X
 Mudry CAP-X Super
 Mudry CAP-X4
 CAP 230
 CAP 231
 CAP 232

Mueller 
 Mueller Safti-Copter

Muessig 
(O G Muessig, OR.)
 Muessig P-2

Mukai 
(Isao Mukai)
 Mukai Olive SMG III

Muller 
(Charles E Muller)
 Muller 1920 Biplane

Müller
(Gebrüder Müller, of Griesheim)
 Müller G.M.G. I
 Müller G.M.G. II

Mulot 
 Mulot AM.220

Mulot
 Mulot AM.20 Sport
 Mulot 1925 monoplane
 Mulot Labor

Multiplane 
(Multiplane Aircraft Corp (Waterbury Button Co), 835 S Main St, Waterbury, CT)
 Multiplane 1929 aeroplane

Mummert 
(Harvey C Mummert, Long Island, NY)
 Mummert Cootie a.k.a.  Baby Vamp
 Mummert Baby Vamp a.k.a. Cootie
 Mummert Mini-plane
 Mummert Red Racer
 Mummert V-2 Sport Plane a.k.a. Sport

Muniz 
(Cia. Nacional Navigaceo Costiera / Fabrica Brasiliera de Aviŏes''' / Capitão Antônio Guedes Muniz)
 Muniz Casmuniz 52
 Muniz M-1 unbuilt design 
 Muniz M-3 unbuilt design 
 Muniz M-5 one built in France exported to Brazil
 Muniz M-6
 Muniz M-7
 Muniz M-8
 Muniz M-9
 Muniz M-11

 Munsell 
(Charles W Munsell, Kenosha, WI)
 Munsell 1927 Biplane

 Munson 
(Raymond Munson, Milwaukee, WI)
 Munson A-1

 Murchio 
(Murchio Flying Service, Paterson, NJ)
 Murchio M-1
 Murchio M-2
 Murchio M-3
 Murchio M-4
 Murchio M-5

 Mureaux see ANF Les Mureaux''

Murphy 
(Mike Murphy, Kokomo, IN)
 Murphy A-1 Over-and-Under

Murphy 
(Cleve Stoskopf, Rancho Palos Verdes, CA)
 Murphy Mouse

Murphy 
(Dick Murphy)
 Murphy VM-7 Competitor

Murphy 
 Murphy Elite
 Murphy Maverick
 Murphy Moose
 Murphy Bull Moose
 Murphy Rebel
 Murphy Renegade
 Murphy Renegade Spirit			
 Murphy Yukon			
 Murphy JDM-8
 Murphy SR2500 Super Rebel
 Murphy SR3500 Super Rebel

Murray 
(William Roland Murray, 1149 Allen Ave, Glendale, CA)
 Murray M-7

Murray 
(Frank A Murray, Rockford, IL)
 Murray 1940 Monoplane
 Murray JN2-D1 Jenette

Murray 
(W Roland Murray)
 Murray ML-60F Flivair

Murray-Carns
(J. W. Murray Co., Detroit, Michigan / Joseph Carnes?)
 Murray-Carns All Steel biplane

Murray-Womack 
((Durard) Murray & (Fritz) Womack, Iola, KS)
 Murray-Womack Sport

Murrayair 
 Murrayair MA-1

Musger 
(Edwin Musger)
 Musger Mg 3

Muşicǎ 
(Grigore Muşicǎ)
 Muşicǎ G.M.-1

Musick-Reynolds 
(Edwin C Musick & Harry Reynolds, Santa Monica, CA)
 Musick-Reynolds 1911 Biplane

Musk

Mustang 
(Mustang Aeronautics (Pres: Chris Tieman), Troy, MI)
 Mustang Aeronautics Midget Mustang
 Mustang Aeronautics Mustang II

Mutual 
(Mutual Aircraft Service/Aircraft Co (Pres: A H Feffle), Kansas City, MO and Norwalk, CT)
 Mutual Blackbird

References

Further reading

External links 

 List of Aircraft (M)

fr:Liste des aéronefs (I-M)